The lycée militaire de Saint-Cyr (or Coldo) is one of six  (formerly 'lycées militaires') of the French Ministry of Defence. Situated at Saint-Cyr-l'École (Yvelines), it occupies a particularly historic building - it succeeds the Maison royale de Saint-Louis, the Prytanée militaire and the École spéciale militaire. The lycée's motto is " [The real school of command is therefore general knowledge]".

References

External links
 Lycée militaire de Saint-Cyr 

Military training establishments of France
Boarding schools in France
Lycées in Yvelines